Owneq Yelqi-ye Sofla (also Romanized as Owneq Yelqī-ye Soflá; also known as Ūneq Yelqī-ye Pā’īn) is a village in Aq Altin Rural District, in the Central District of Aqqala County, Golestan Province, Iran. At the 2006 census, its population was 448, in 91 families.

References 

Populated places in Aqqala County